The manchineel tree (Hippomane mancinella) is a species of flowering plant in the spurge family (Euphorbiaceae). Its native range stretches from tropical southern North America to northern South America.

The name "manchineel" (sometimes spelled "manchioneel" or "manchineal"), as well as the specific epithet mancinella, are from Spanish manzanilla ("little apple"), from the superficial resemblance of its fruit and leaves to those of an apple tree. It is also called beach apple.

This refers to the fact that manchineel is one of the most toxic trees in the world: the tree has milky-white sap which contains numerous toxins and can cause blistering. The sap is present in every part of the tree  bark, leaves, and fruit.

Description
It has reddish-grayish bark, small greenish-yellow flowers, and shiny green leaves.

Spikes of small greenish flowers are followed by fruits, which are similar in appearance to an apple, are green or greenish-yellow when ripe. The fruit is poisonous, as is every other part of the tree.

Distribution and habitat 
Manchineel is native to the Caribbean, the U.S. state of Florida, the Bahamas, Mexico, Central America, and northern South America.

The manchineel tree can be found on coastal beaches and in brackish swamps, where it grows among mangroves. It provides excellent natural windbreaks and its roots stabilize the sand, thus reducing beach erosion.

Conservation 
The manchineel tree is listed as an endangered species in Florida.

Toxicity 

All parts of the tree contain strong toxins. Its milky white sap contains phorbol and other skin irritants, producing strong allergic contact dermatitis.

Standing beneath the tree during rain will cause blistering of the skin from mere contact with this liquid: even a small drop of rain with the milky substance in it will cause the skin to blister. The sap has also been known to damage the paint on cars. Burning the tree may cause ocular injuries if the smoke reaches the eyes. Contact with its milky sap (latex) produces bullous dermatitis, acute keratoconjunctivitis and possibly large corneal epithelial defects.

Although the fruit is potentially fatal if eaten, no such occurrences have been reported in the modern literature. Ingestion can produce severe gastroenteritis with bleeding, shock, and bacterial superinfection, as well as the potential for airway compromise due to edema.

When ingested, the fruit is reportedly "pleasantly sweet" at first, with a subsequent "strange peppery feeling ... gradually progress[ing] to a burning, tearing sensation and tightness of the throat." Symptoms continue to worsen until the patient can "barely swallow solid food because of the excruciating pain and the feeling of a huge obstructing pharyngeal lump."

In some parts of its range, many trees carry a warning sign – for example on Curaçao – while others are marked with a red "X" on the trunk to indicate danger. In the French Antilles the trees are often marked with a painted red band roughly 1 metre (3 ft) above the ground.

Although the plant is toxic to many birds and other animals, the black-spined iguana (Ctenosaura similis) is known to eat the fruit and even live among the limbs of the tree.

The tree contains 12-deoxy-5-hydroxyphorbol-6-gamma-7-alpha-oxide, hippomanins, mancinellin, and sapogenin. Phloracetophenone-2,4-dimethylether is present in the leaves, while the fruits possess physostigmine.

A poultice of arrowroot (Maranta arundinacea) was used by the Arawak and Taíno as an antidote against such poisons. The Caribs were known to poison the water supply of their enemies with the leaves. Spanish explorer Juan Ponce de León died shortly after an injury incurred in battle with the Calusa in Florida—being struck by an arrow that had been poisoned with manchineel sap.

Uses 
Despite the inherent dangers associated with handling it, the tree has been used as a source of wood by Caribbean furniture makers for centuries. It must be cut and left to dry in the sun to dry the sap. To avoid dangerous contact with the poisonous parts, the tree may be burnt at the base to fell it.

Culture 

 William Ellis, ship's surgeon for James Cook on his final voyage, wrote:

On the fourth, a party of men were sent to cut wood, as the island apparently afforded plenty of that article; amongst other trees they unluckily cut down several of the manchineel, the juice of which getting into their eyes, rendered them blind for several days.

 Alexandre Exquemelin wrote in The Buccaneers of America of his experience with the "tree called mancanilla, or dwarf-apple-tree" when in Hispaniola:

One day being hugely tormented with mosquitoes or gnats, and as yet unacquainted with the nature of this tree, I cut a branch thereof, to serve me instead of a fan, but all my face swelled the next day and filled with blisters, as if it were burnt to such a degree that I was blind for three days.

Nicholas Cresswell, in his journal entry for Friday, September 16, 1774, mentions:

The Mangeneel Apple has the smell and appearance of an English Apple, but small, grows on large trees, generally along the Seashore. They are rank poison. I am told that one apple is sufficient to kill 20 people. This poison is of such a malignant nature that a single drop of rain or dew that falls from the tree upon your skin will immediately raise a blister. Neither Fruit or Wood is of any use, that I can learn.

 In Giacomo Meyerbeer's opera L'Africaine (1865), the heroine Sélika dies by inhaling the perfume of the manchineel tree's blossoms.
 In the story "The Beckoning Hand", in the 1887 collection of that name by Grant Allen, a manchineel (spelled "manchineal" here) leaf is rolled in a cigarette in an attempt to poison a person.
 In the film Wind Across the Everglades (1958), a notorious poacher named Cottonmouth (played by Burl Ives) ties a victim to the trunk of a manchineel tree.
 The tree is recorded as the world's most dangerous tree by Guinness World Records.

See also
 Bahamian dry forests
 Saba
 Cape Sable, Florida

References

External links

 Useful Links for Neotropical Flowering Plant Identification

Hippomaneae
Trees of the Caribbean
Trees of Central America
Trees of Antigua and Barbuda
Trees of the Bahamas
Trees of Belize
Trees of the Cayman Islands
Trees of Colombia
Trees of Costa Rica
Trees of Cuba
Trees of Dominica
Trees of the Dominican Republic
Trees of Haiti
Trees of Mexico
Trees of Nicaragua
Trees of Panama
Trees of Puerto Rico
Trees of Trinidad and Tobago
Trees of Venezuela
Flora of the Dutch Caribbean
Flora of the Netherlands Antilles
Flora of Saint Vincent and the Grenadines
Biota of Bonaire
Plants described in 1753
Taxa named by Carl Linnaeus
Medicinal plants
Poisonous plants